James Allan Ross (18 October 192718 September 2015) was an Australian rules footballer in the VFL. He was a star ruckman and centre half-forward.

Ross won three club Best and Fairest awards. He left St Kilda and coached in Tasmania when only 26 years old, winning All-Australian selection in 1958.

He was the fifth Tasmanian inducted into St Kilda's Hall of Fame. During his career at St Kilda he represented Victoria four times.

Ross died at the Launceston General Hospital in Launceston, Tasmania on 18 September 2015.

References

External links 
St Kilda Hall of Fame Profile
Saints honour roll

1927 births
2015 deaths
St Kilda Football Club players
North Launceston Football Club players
All-Australians (1953–1988)
Trevor Barker Award winners
Australian rules footballers from Victoria (Australia)
Tasmanian Football Hall of Fame inductees
North Launceston Football Club coaches